Calver is a surname. Notable people with the surname include:

Aaron Calver (born 1996), Australian soccer player
Bronwyn Calver (born 1969), Australian cricketer
Clive Calver (born 1949), American religious leader
Craig Calver (born 1991), English footballer
Edward Calver (fl. 1649), English poet
Edward Killwick Calver (1813 – 1892), Royal Navy officer and hydrographic surveyor
Homer Calver (1892 – 1970), American health educator
John Calver (c. 1695 – 1751), English clockmaker
Stu Calver (died 2000), British singer